The reconstructive ladder is the set of levels of increasingly complex management of wounds in reconstructive plastic surgery. The surgeon should start on the lowest rung and move up until a suitable technique is reached.

There are several small variations in the reconstructive ladder in the scientific literature, but the principles remains the same:
  
 Healing by secondary intention
 Primary closure
 Delayed primary closure
 Split thickness graft
 Full thickness skin graft
 Tissue expansion
 Random flap
 Axial flap
 Free flap

See also
 List of plastic surgery flaps
 Perforator flaps

References

Plastic surgery